Henderson is a city and the county seat of Vance County, North Carolina, United States. The population was 15,060 at the 2020 census.

History
The city was named in honor of former North Carolina Supreme Court Chief Justice Leonard Henderson, who lived nearby and was a friend of early settler Lewis Reavis.  Henderson was officially chartered by the North Carolina General Assembly in 1841.

Prior to the creation of Vance County in 1881, Henderson was located in far eastern Granville County.

Ashland, Henderson Central Business Historic District, Henderson Fire Station and Municipal Building, Library and Laboratory Building-Henderson Institute, Mistletoe Villa, Maria Parham Hospital, Daniel Stone Plank House, Vance County Courthouse, West End School, Zollicoffer's Law Office, and Barker House are listed on the National Register of Historic Places.

Geography

Henderson benefits from its location near Interstate 85 and U.S. 1. Highway 39 also runs through Henderson.

Demographics

2020 census

As of the 2020 United States census, there were 15,060 people, 5,715 households, and 3,549 families residing in the city.

2000 census
At the 2000 census there were 16,095 people, 6,332 households, and 4,122 families living in the city. The population density was 1,953.7 people per square mile (754.2/km). There were 6,870 housing units at an average density of 833.9 per square mile (321.9/km).  The racial makeup of the city was 59.17% African American, 32.76% White, 0.27% Native American, 0.64% Asian, 0.02% Pacific Islander, 2.36% from other races, and 0.77% from two or more races. Hispanic or Latino of any race were 5.13%.

Of the 6,332 households 31.3% had children under the age of 18 living with them, 34.1% were married couples living together, 26.7% had a female householder with no husband present, and 34.9% were non-families. 30.7% of households were one person and 14.4% were one person aged 65 or older. The average household size was 2.47 and the average family size was 3.05.

The age distribution was 27.4% under the age of 18, 8.9% from 18 to 24, 26.8% from 25 to 44, 20.6% from 45 to 64, and 16.4% 65 or older. The median age was 36 years. For every 100 females, there were 82.2 males. For every 100 females age 18 and over, there were 75.5 males.

The median household income was $23,745 and the median family income  was $30,222. Males had a median income of $26,804 versus $19,910 for females. The per capita income for the city was $15,130. About 23.4% of families and 28.3% of the population were below the poverty line, including 40.5% of those under age 18 and 20.9% of those age 65 or over.

Transportation

Rail
Henderson is located on the S-Line, the former main line of the Seaboard Air Line Railroad now owned by CSX Transportation. The city was last served by passenger rail in 1986, at which time Amtrak's long-distance Silver Star was re-routed through Rocky Mount and part of the S-Line was abandoned. Restoration of the line is planned as part of the Southeast High Speed Rail Corridor project.

Notable people

 Gerald Alston (1951  ), member of R&B vocal group The Manhattans
 George Lincoln Blackwell (1861  1926), theologian and author
 Charles Briggs (1932  1985), American actor
 Charlotte Hawkins Brown (1883  1961), educator and founder of the Palmer Institute 
 Jason Brown (1983  ), professional football player with the St. Louis Rams
 Duke Buchan (1963  ), United States Ambassador to Spain and Andorra, raised near Henderson
 Danny Flowers (1948  ), songwriter of "Tulsa Time"
 Elson Floyd (1956  2015), educator and 10th president of Washington State University
 Rachel Henderlite (1905 1991), Presbyterian minister and educator
Dave Henderson (1964 -), basketball player, 1991 Israeli Basketball Premier League MVP
 Isaiah Hicks (1994  ), basketball player for the New York Knicks
 Sammy Jackson (1937  1995), actor.
 Ben E. King (1938  2015), soul and pop singer, best known as the singer and co-composer of "Stand by Me"
 Shirley Owens (1941  ), singer, member of the Shirelles
 Charlie Rose (1942  ), television talk show host and journalist, was born and raised in Henderson
 Wilbur Fisk Tillett (18541936), theologian and dean of Vanderbilt Divinity School

References

External links
 Official website of Henderson, North Carolina
 Historic Downtown Business District
 Henderson-Vance Chamber of Commerce

Cities in North Carolina
Cities in Vance County, North Carolina
County seats in North Carolina